58 (fifty-eight) is the natural number following 57 and preceding 59.

In mathematics

Fifty-eight is an 11-gonal number, and a Smith number.
Given 58, the Mertens function returns 0.

58 is the smallest integer whose square root has a continued fraction with period 7.

58 is equal to the sum of the first seven consecutive prime numbers:  This is a difference of 1 from the 17th prime number and 7th super-prime, 59.

There is no solution to the equation x – φ(x) = 58, making 58 a noncototient. However, the sum of the totient function for the first thirteen integers is 58.

The regular icosahedron produces 58 distinct stellations, the most of any other Platonic solid, which collectively produce 62 stellations.

With regard to Coxeter groups and uniform polytopes in higher dimensional spaces, there are:
58 distinct uniform polytopes in the fifth dimension that are generated from symmetries of three Coxeter groups, they are the A5 simplex group, B5 cubic group, and the D5 demihypercubic group;

58 fundamental Coxeter groups that generate uniform polytopes in the seventh dimension, with only four of these generating uniform non-prismatic figures. 

There exist 58 total paracompact Coxeter groups of ranks four through ten, with realizations in dimensions three through nine. These solutions all contain infinite facets and vertex figures, in contrast from compact hyperbolic groups that contain finite elements; there are no other such groups with higher or lower ranks.

In science
The atomic number of cerium, a lanthanide.

Astronomy

Messier object M58, a magnitude 11.0 galaxy in the constellation Virgo.
The New General Catalogue object NGC 58, a barred spiral galaxy in the constellation Cetus. It is also the object designated as NGC 47.

In music
 John Cage composition Fifty-Eight.
 Fifty-Eight Now Nine, a collection of songs by Esther Lee.
 58 was the name of a side project involving Nikki Sixx of Mötley Crüe. They covered the song "Alone Again (Naturally)".
 Band "Spur58".
 "58 Poems" by Chicago.

In sports

In the NBA, the most points ever scored in a fourth quarter was 58 by the Buffalo Braves (at Boston Celtics), October 20, 1972. The most points in a game by a rookie player: Wilt Chamberlain, 58: Philadelphia vs. Detroit, January 25, 1960, and Philadelphia vs. New York Knicks, February 21, 1960.

In MotoGP, 58 was the number of Marco Simoncelli who died in an accident at the Malaysian Round of the 2011 MotoGP season. MotoGP's governing body, the FIM, are considering to retire number 58 from use in MotoGP as they did before with the numbers 74 and 48 of Daijiro Kato and Shoya Tomizawa, respectively.  The retirement, from all motorcycle racing classes, eventually occurred in 2016, joining Kato's 74, the 34 of inaugural MotoGP champion Kevin Schwantz and the 65 of Loris Capirossi.

On the PGA Tour, 58 is the lowest score in an 18-hole round, achieved by Jim Furyk in the final round of the 2016 Travelers Championship at TPC River Highlands.

In Formula One, 58 is the number of laps of the Australian Grand Prix since 1996, when the Grand Prix held at Albert Park.

In mythology
Belief in the existence of 58 original sins by several civilizations native to Central America or South America caused the number to symbolize misfortune. Aztec oracles supposedly stumbled across the number an unnaturally high number of times before disaster fell. One famous recording of this, though largely discredited as mere folktale, concerned the oracle of Moctezuma II, who allegedly counted 58 pieces of gold scattered before a sacrificial pit the day prior to the arrival of Hernán Cortés.

In other fields
 The code for international direct dial phone calls to Venezuela (+58)
The number of usable cells on a Hexxagon game board
Book: 58 Lonely Men: Southern Federal Judges and School Desegregation about 58 judges in the South during the Brown v. Board of Education decision
The number of counties in California
The minimum wind speed (mph) needed to issue a Severe Thunderstorm Warning
The number of the French department Nièvre
In the popular TV show SpongeBob SquarePants, Patrick claims that "58 is like the luckiest number ever."
58 Minutes is a book by Walter Wager, on which the film Die Hard 2 was based
I-58 was the name of one of the Type B3 submarines that fought in World War II

See also 
 List of highways numbered 58

References 

Integers